This article lists diplomatic missions resident in City of San Marino. At present, the tiny country hosts 3 embassies. Many other countries have ambassadors accredited to San Marino, with most being resident in Rome. Some countries, while accrediting an ambassador from Rome, conduct day-to-day relations and provide consular services from Consulates General in nearby Italian cities, such as Milan or Florence, or employ honorary consuls; at present, there are eight honorary consulates located in San Marino: Austria, Bulgaria, Croatia, France, Japan, Mexico, Monaco and Romania.

Embassies 

Resident in City of San Marino unless otherwise noted

 (Falciano)

Honorary consulates in San Marino

Non-resident embassies 
(Resident in Rome unless otherwise noted)

Representatives

See also 
List of diplomatic missions of San Marino

Notes

South Ossetia unilaterally declared independence in 1992. Russia recognized the country in 2008. San Marino has not recognized the independence of South Ossetia. Nevertheless, both countries have informal relations.

References

External links 
 San Marino Secretary of State website

Foreign relations of San Marino
Diplomatic missions
San Marino

Diplomatic missions